John Uliny, also known as Johnson Olony, Johnson Olonyi, and John Olony, is a South Sudanese militia leader. He is a member of the Shilluk ethnic group.

Biography
Uliny is from Upper Nile. He was the leader of a group of forces waiting for integration into the Sudan People's Liberation Army (SPLA). After a conflict emerged between his forces and the SPLA, he fled to South Kordofan in Sudan. He there aligned himself with the South Sudan Democratic Movement (SSDM or SSDM/A) of George Athor.

In February 2012, he claimed the leadership of the South Sudan Democratic Movement, shortly after the death of leader George Athor. He subsequently entered into peace talks with the South Sudanese government. On 13 June 2013, he accepted the amnesty offered by the government of President Salva Kiir Mayardit. He was formally inducted into the military and given the rank of major general. His forces, however, were not integrated in the army structure.

In February 2014, he was wounded by a shot to the neck after opposing forces aligned with Riek Machar entered the city of Malakal.

In February 2015, his forces were reported by UNICEF to be forcibly enlisting child soldiers.

In April 2015, his deputy was shot and tensions between the forces of Uliny and government forces rose. The state government and governor left the city of Malakal which the forces of Uliny controlled. Uliny did not report to government forces for weeks and did not attend meetings in Juba. On 15 May, the forces of Uliny declared they wished to run the affairs of Malakal independently, and announced the name of their group as Agwelek Forces. They stated they were willing to work together with other opposition forces such as the Sudan People's Liberation Movement-in-Opposition.

References

Year of birth missing (living people)
Living people
People from Upper Nile (state)
People of the South Sudanese Civil War
South Sudanese military personnel